Roman Mikhailovich Manushin (born 6 January 1977) is a former Russian football player.

References

1977 births
Living people
Russian footballers
FC Dynamo Stavropol players
Russian Premier League players
FC Sibir Novosibirsk players
Association football midfielders